The Berlin Long-faced Tumbler is a breed of fancy pigeon. Berlin Long-faced Tumblers, along with other varieties of domesticated pigeons, are all descendants of the rock dove (Columba livia).

See also 

List of pigeon breeds

Pigeon breeds